Florian Hoffmann (born 1981) is a German social entrepreneur and founder of The DO School. He sits on the Supervisory Board of the World Future Council, and was named one of 100 Young Global Leaders by the World Economic Forum in 2017. In 2018, he was one of 50 Germans to be featured in We:Deutschland by British artist Marcus Lyon. Additionally, Hoffmann co-founded the Dekeyser&Friends Foundation in Geneva.

Hoffmann regularly speaks on the topics of societal innovation, education, and social entrepreneurship. He has taught The DO School method at various renowned universities such as the Hasso Plattner Institute at Potsdam University and the EBS University of Business and Law. His work has been covered widely in publications such as the Financial Times, The Wall Street Journal, Monocle (media company) and more.

Early life and education
Florian Hoffmann is the son of designer Mathias Hoffmann and grew up between Tübingen, Germany and Ibiza, Spain. Florian played competitive handball and was later listed at the European Handball Federation playing first in the German youth league. Hoffmann graduated from the Kepler Gymnasium and served as student speaker from 1998–2000.

Hoffmann studied at the European College of Liberal Arts, Duke University, Humboldt University and St Antony's College, Oxford. At Duke, his professors included Frederick Jameson and Peter Feaver. Hoffmann wrote his BA on normative foreign policy supervised by Ellen M. Immergut. Hoffmann also participated in the Harvard Project for Asian and International Relations in 2005. Hoffmann received the DAAD Scholarship to pursue his graduate studies at Oxford University. At Oxford, Florian Hoffmann worked with Kalypso Nicolaidis, Timothy Garton-Ash and Michael Freeden researching a common European Value Pluralism finishing an MPHil with distinction and starting a DPhil, which he did not complete.

Career
In 2008, Hoffmann co-founded the Dekeyser&Friends Foundation in Geneva, together with entrepreneur and former footballer Bobby Dekeyser. The foundation was established to help empower youth to follow their dreams and create real change in the world.  From 2009 until 2012, Hoffmann co-developed the creative strategy of the furniture company DEDON and co-founded DEDON Island, an island resort and social business fostering sustainable tourism in the Philippines.

In 2013, he founded The DO School, an educational institution offering innovative educational opportunities to emerging social entrepreneurs and executive consulting programs to leading organizations. As of 2019, The DO School operates in three different continents with offices in Berlin, Hong Kong, Hamburg, and New York City.

References

1981 births
Living people